Moorsholm is a village in the unitary authority of Redcar and Cleveland and the ceremonial county of North Yorkshire, England.

Because of its proximity to the North Sea coast the area was vulnerable, historically, to attack by invaders from Scandinavia. The name of Moorsholm is of Viking origin with the suffix holm, which meant a settlement, being affixed to the location of the village by the moors: so meaning settlement by the moors. The village used to be called Great Moorsholm to distinguish it from a farm called Little Moorsholm, which is the other side of the Hagg Beck Valley to the north. 'Little Moorsholm' is a title now more commonly applied to a more modern housing estate between that farm and Lingdale. The settlement was mentioned in the Domesday book as Morehusum, belonging to the Earl of Morton and later Clan Bruce, ancestor to the kings of Scotland, and from them descended to the Thwengs, Lumleys, and others. It was a planned mediaeval village built along a main street with crofts and their associated tofts on each side. The church of St Mary, Moorsholm, was built in 1892 and is of stone in 12th-century style. It consists of chancel, nave and west tower.
The Memorial Hall was built as a war memorial in 1957 and is used as the doctors’ surgery and meeting room.

About  to the south of Moorsholm is the landmark of Freebrough Hill, a detached natural hill which is conical in shape.

Sport 
Moorsholm Athletic is the village football team for Junior players. The club competes in the Teesside Junior Football Alliance (TJFA). In recent years villagers have started their own tournament, pitting the under 30s in the village against the over 30s as an 11-a-side extension of the popular summer 5-a-side fixture.

Moorsholm Cricket Club has a history of activity dating back to 1911 and the club's ground is based on The Green, Guisborough Road. The club have two senior teams: a Saturday 1st XI that compete in the Langbaurgh Cricket League and a Mid-Week Senior XI in the Esk Valley Evening League. Moorsholm CC also have a junior training section that play competitive cricket in the Derwent Valley Junior Cricket League.

Moorsholm also play league Quoits, and darts is also played in the village.

References

External links 

Moorsholm Village

Villages in North Yorkshire
Places in the Tees Valley
Redcar and Cleveland